Walnut Township is one of eleven townships in Montgomery County, Indiana, United States. As of the 2010 census, its population was 1,394 and it contained 604 housing units.

Geography

Cities, towns, villages
 New Ross

Unincorporated towns
 Beckville at 
 Linnsburg at 
 Log Cabin Crossroads at 
 Mace at 
(This list is based on USGS data and may include former settlements.)

Cemeteries
The township contains these two cemeteries: New Ross and Pisgah.

Major highways
  Interstate 74
  U.S. Route 136

School districts
 South Montgomery Community School Corporation

Political districts
 Indiana's 4th congressional district
 State House District 28
 State Senate District 23

References
 
 United States Census Bureau 2008 TIGER/Line Shapefiles
 IndianaMap

External links
 Indiana Township Association
 United Township Association of Indiana
 City-Data.com page for Walnut Township

Townships in Montgomery County, Indiana
Townships in Indiana